Sergio Massidda is an Italian weightlifter. He represented Italy at the 2019 World Weightlifting Championships, as well as the 2021 European Championships and 2018 World Championships.

He won the gold medal in the men's 55kg event at the 2019 Youth World Weightlifting Championships held in Las Vegas, United States.

At the 2021 European Junior & U23 Weightlifting Championships in Rovaniemi, Finland, he won the gold medal in his event.

He won the gold medal in his event at the 2022 European Junior & U23 Weightlifting Championships held in Durrës, Albania.

References 

Living people
2002 births
Italian male weightlifters
21st-century Italian people